Knud Gleie (15 March 1935 – 21 January 2010) was a Danish swimmer. He competed at the 1952 Summer Olympics and the 1956 Summer Olympics in the 200 meter breaststroke.

In 1953, the breaststroke was bifurcated into what is now known as the breaststroke and the butterfly strokes.  FINA set a standard of time of 2:38 for the 200m breaststroke world mark.  Gleie was the first inside that mark with a time of 2:37.4 on 14 February 1953.

See also
World record progression 200 metres breaststroke

References

External links
 

1935 births
2010 deaths
Danish male breaststroke swimmers
Olympic swimmers of Denmark
Swimmers at the 1952 Summer Olympics
Swimmers at the 1956 Summer Olympics
Swimmers from Copenhagen